Formica fossaceps is a species of ant in the genus Formica (wood ants, mound ants, and field ants), in the family Formicidae. This species is a member of the Formica rufa species group.

References

Further reading
 

fossaceps
Insects described in 1942